William Helyar (8 January 1559 – 21 November 1645) of Coker Court, East Coker, in Somerset, was Archdeacon of Barnstaple and a chaplain to Queen Elizabeth I.

Biography
He was the son of William Helyar by his wife Alice Veale and was baptised on 8 January 1559 at St. Budeaux, Devon. He graduated M.A. from Exeter College, Oxford in 1587. His later clerical appointments included:
 Vicar in 1577 of Bickleigh, Devon
 Rector in 1582 of Dunchideock, Devon
 Rector in 1588 of Charlton, Devon
 Canon of Exeter Cathedral in 1596
 Vicar in 1602 of Heavitree, Devon
 Archdeacon of Barnstaple from 1605
 Rector of North Tawton, Devon, between 1610 and 1645

In 1616 he purchased Coker Court, the manor house of East Coker, Somerset, from Sir Edward Phelips. He started the construction of the Helyar Almshouses in East Coker in 1640, but died before their completion. They were finished by his grandson  William Helyar.

During the Civil War, on 19 January 1642, he was dragged at midnight from his bed in Exeter by Roundheads and carried on board a ship, where he was detained until he consented to pay the sum of £800. He received a copy of the protection thus purchased: 
"Whereas Archdeacon Helyar has submitted and sent eight hundred pounds to the parliament upon the propositions. These are therefore, to require all the forces of the parliament to take notice thereof and to protect him in his person, family, and goods, strictly charging and commanding that no man henceforth, molest or trouble him. January 19, 1642, signed, Jo. Northcote, Sam. Rolle” etc etc

Marriage and children
He married Mary Cary (died 1607), daughter of William Cary of Cockington, Devon, by whom he had children including:
Henry Helyar (died 1634) who in 1621 married Christiana Cary (died 1634) daughter of William Cary (1576–1652), lord of the manor of Clovelly, Devon, JP for Devon, MP for Mitchell, Cornwall, in 1604. He predeceased his father. His son William Helyar (died 1697) thus succeeded his grandfather to the manor Coker Court in 1645.
Elizabeth Helyar (christened 12 May 1591), who on 29 April 1606 married John Bridgeman, son of Thomas Bridgeman and later Bishop of Chester.

References

1559 births
1645 deaths
Archdeacons of Barnstaple
Alumni of Exeter College, Oxford
16th-century English Anglican priests
17th-century English Anglican priests